NGC 46, occasionally referred to as PGC 5067596, is an F8 star located approximately 962 ± 281 light-years from the Solar System in the constellation Pisces. It was first discovered on October 22, 1852 by Irish astronomer Edward Joshua Cooper, who incorrectly identified it as a nebula.

See also 
 List of NGC objects (1–1000)
 Pisces (constellation)

References

External links 
 
 
 SEDS

0046
18521022
Pisces (constellation)
F-type subgiants
Discoveries by Edward Joshua Cooper